Unlimited Fafnir, originally titled  is a Japanese light novel series written by Tsukasa and illustrated by Riko Korie. Kodansha has published fifteen volumes from July 2013 to November 2017 under their Kodansha Ranobe Bunko imprint. A manga adaptation with art by Saburouta began serialization in Kodansha's seinen manga magazine good! Afternoon from March 2014 to December 2015 and is being published digitally by Crunchyroll in North America. An anime television series adaptation by Diomedéa aired from January 2015 to March 2015.

Plot
The story takes place in a world where supernatural monsters known as "dragons" once existed. 25 years ago, they caused widespread destruction and burnt everything in their path, after which they mysteriously vanished. Soon afterwards, girls born with abilities similar to that of the dragons known as D's came into existence. These D's attend Midgar Academy, an all-girls academy where they can learn to control their powers and use them to battle the dragons.

However, many years later, the secret existence of the only male D in the world, Yuu Mononobe gets thrown into light. Against his wishes, he gets forcibly enrolled into the academy, where he accidentally stumbles upon a girl named Iris Freyja in a state of undress. Embarrassed, she attacks him in self-defense, but the attack ends up getting backfired. Now, Yuu must forge relationships with the other girls in the academy, which includes his adoptive sister, Mitsuki. Together, they must battle against the dragons and uncover the reason behind their sudden disappearance and reappearance.

Characters

Class Brynhildr

The protagonist and the only male "D" in the world. He is a 2nd Lieutenant in NIFL and is sent to Midgard on a mission to prevent "D" girls from becoming dragons and so causing widespread destruction. His superior, Loki considers Yū to be the best Fafnir. Upon arriving in Midgard he is reunited with his younger sister, Mitsuki, after a separation of three years. His dark matter fictional weapon is a gun. He receives kisses from Iris on the lips, and Mitsuki, Tear, and Kili on the cheek. Yū has formed a contract with the Dragon Yggdrasil, which allows him to create a gigantic cannon called Marduk, capable of killing other Dragons, but at the cost of losing his memories. He is revealed to be a Dragon in Volume 8.

The female protagonist and the oddball of class Brynhildr. Although she has a lot of power, she is inept at using it. She is on the verge of becoming a dragon and feels resigned to her fate until Yū arrives and changes her outlook at life. She also has romantic feelings for Yū, having given him her first kiss as a thank you for everything he has done for her, and is embarrassed when he compliments her on her appearance. Her dark matter fictional weapon is a magic staff called Caduceus.

The student body president of Midgar and Yū's childhood friend who becomes his adoptive younger sister; she likes her 'brother' very much. She was close friends with Haruka's younger sister, Miyako, and during the invasion of the purple Kraken, she was reluctantly forced to kill Miyako, who had become a dragon. Since then, she has been heavily burdened by the responsibility and hasn't gotten along with Lisa because of it. Her dark matter fictional weapon is a bow called Brionac.

One of the main heroines; she is a girl from class Brynhildr who thinks of her classmates as family. She has a strong animosity towards Mitsuki for killing Haruka's younger sister, even though it was the only course of action given the circumstances. She is really close to Tear and is in charge of protecting and taking care of her which brings her and Yuu closer. Her dark matter fictional weapon is a spear called Gungnir.

A girl who is into books. Her dark matter fictional weapon is a grimoire called Necronomicon.

A tomboyish girl who is a skilled martial artist. Her dark matter fictional weapon is a shield called Aegis.

An intelligent girl who is usually seen tinkering on a computer. Her dark matter fictional weapon is a mallet called Mjolnir.

A "D" girl who transfers into class Brynhildr. She claims to be Yū's wife and strongly believes herself to be a dragon. She had lived a peaceful life until a dragon cult led by Kili burned her house down and killed her parents. Having been praised by the cult, she took pride in being a dragon, but after meeting Yū she changed her outlook and devoted herself to living as a human. She considers Iris to be her rival for Yū's affections, claiming she won't lose to her.

Other characters

The leader of a dragon cult. She holds Tear in high regard and wants her to become a dragon. She disguises herself as Honoka after NIFL took custody of Tear in order to get her back. She became interested in Yū and kissed him after sparing her life.

A mysterious new student at Midgar Academy. It is later revealed that she is actually Kili.

The homeroom teacher of class Brynhildr and Colonel in NIFL. Her younger sister Miyako perished during a battle two years ago.

Yū's superior in NIFL. He ordered Yū to enroll at Midgar to keep a watch on the "D" to keep them from becoming dragons and to kill any "D" who become dragons.

The headmaster of Midgard Academy and one of the Dragons, 'Gray' Vampire. She has the appearance of a grade school girl.

Charlotte's attendant.

Media

Light novels
The first light novel volume was published on July 2, 2013 by Kodansha under their Kodansha Ranobe Bunko imprint. As of November 2017, the series is complete, with fifteen volumes having been published.

Manga
A manga adaptation, illustrated by Saburouta, was serialized in Kodansha's seinen manga magazine good! Afternoon from March 7, 2014 to December 7, 2015. Kodansha collected its chapters in four tankōbon volumes, released from October 2, 2014 to March 7, 2016.

Anime
An anime television series adaptation by Diomedéa aired from January 9, 2015 to March 26, 2015. The opening theme is "Flying fafnir", created and performed by trustrick, while the ending theme is "Ray of bullet" by Rina Hidaka and Manami Numakura voice actresses of anime heroines Iris Freyja and Mitsuki Mononobe respectively from episodes 1-12 though episode 12 was sung together with Hisako Kanemoto, Sora Tokui, Fumiko Uchimura and Ayane Sakura who are also voice actresses of Lisa Highwalker, Ariella Lu, Ren Miyazawa, and Tear Lightning respectively.

Episode list

Reception
The anime series' first episode garnered negative reviews from Anime News Network's staff during the Winter 2015 season previews. Nick Creamer criticized the rampant use of comedy gags and fantasy-harem clichés throughout the runtime and the artwork feeling lifeless and off-model, but was entertained by the unintentional humor from the show's magical terminology. Rebecca Silverman felt the premise and ideas throughout had potential but were hampered by unlikable characters and poor execution in its pacing and animation, concluding that: "If those can be resolved, it may well turn out better than it appears. As a first episode, however, it is less than impressive." Theron Martin put the show's debut alongside Absolute Duos in the run for "blandest start to the new season," criticizing the uninspired setup of its dragons, overlong character introductions and an inconsistent color palette.

References

Notes

External links
Official website 
Official anime website 

2013 Japanese novels
Anime and manga based on light novels
Diomedéa
Fantasy anime and manga
Harem anime and manga
Japanese fantasy novels
Kodansha manga
Kodansha Ranobe Bunko
Light novels
Seinen manga
TBS Television (Japan) original programming